Ahmed El-Minabawi (born 21 July 1928) was an Egyptian boxer. He competed in the men's heavyweight event at the 1952 Summer Olympics.

References

External links
  

1928 births
Possibly living people
Egyptian male boxers
Olympic boxers of Egypt
Boxers at the 1952 Summer Olympics
Mediterranean Games medalists in boxing
Heavyweight boxers
Boxers at the 1951 Mediterranean Games
Mediterranean Games silver medalists for Egypt
20th-century Egyptian people